"All Out of Love" is a song by British/Australian soft rock duo Air Supply, released as a single in 1980 from their fifth studio album Lost in Love.  The song was written by Graham Russell and Clive Davis. The song's lyrics describe the  emotional state of a man desperately trying to win back the love of his life after the couple's separation caused by a  wrong done by the man against the woman he's in love with. In the United States, it reached number two on the Hot 100 (blocked from the top spot by both "Upside Down" by Diana Ross and "Another One Bites the Dust" by Queen) and number 5 on the Adult Contemporary chart. In the UK, the song reached number 11 and is their only top 40 hit in that country. It placed 92nd in VH1's list of the "100 Greatest Love Songs" in 2003.

History
The chorus was originally "I'm all out of love, I want to arrest you". However, Clive Davis thought that would be confusing to American audiences so he suggested "I'm all out of love, I'm so lost without you", which led to him being given a songwriting credit.

The song is known for vocalist Russell Hitchcock holding the final note for 16.2 seconds. This was the longest-held note for a male pop singer until 1983, when Sheriff lead vocalist Freddy Curci held the final note of "When I'm with You" for 19.4 seconds.

Reception
Cash Box said that "a dynamite chorus and swelling crescendo insure hit status." Record World called it a "formula-perfect follow-up" to "Lost in Love."

Personnel
Russell Hitchcock - second lead vocals
Graham Russell - first lead vocals and backing vocals, guitar
Air Supply, Robie Porter, and Frank Esler-Smith - arrangement

Track listing
Air Supply version:
"All Out of Love" – 4.01
"Here I Am" – 3.48
"Every Woman in the World" – 3.32

Charts and certifications

Weekly charts

Year-end charts

Certifications

Andru Donalds version

In 1999, Andru Donalds recorded a cover version of the song that was successful in German-speaking Europe, peaking at number three in Austria, Germany, and Switzerland. It is from the album Snowin' Under My Skin, and also appears on the compilation album Chart Hits 6 - 1999.

Music video
The music video is set in a desert. In the first half of the song, Donalds sings the song blindfolded to deserters also blindfolded. In between, shades are also displayed and a bowl is filled with water. From the second half, he sings without a blindfold and draws the attention of a resident to the end.

Track listing
CD-maxi
 "All Out of Love" (radio edit) - 4:00	
 "All Out of Love" (Dance Radio Mix) - 3:59	
 "All Out of Love" (Slow Ambient Mix) - 4:18	
 "All Out of Love" (Ambient Club Mix) - 6:23

Charts

Weekly charts

Year-end charts

Certifications

Other versions
In 1997, Irish boy band OTT released their version of the song which peaked at No. 11 on the UK Singles Chart, the same peak position as the original.
In 2003, Dutch trance act The Foundation featuring singer Natalie Rossi scored a top 40 hit on the UK Singles Chart with their version. It also reached No. 20 on the UK Dance Singles Chart.
In 2006, Westlife recorded and performed the song on The X Factor as a duet with Delta Goodrem on that group's album, The Love Album. It charted without being properly released as a single, peaking at No. 31 on the Swedish singles chart in 2007.
In 2021, actor and singer Iñigo Pascual released his version of the song under Tarsier Records, which received praise from Air Supply.

In other media
 The song featured in the 2002 movie Bad Company. A cover by Jagged Edge was also included on the soundtrack release.
 "All Out of Love" features in a scene in the 2010 Australian crime drama Animal Kingdom.
 "All Out of Love" was featured in the 2018 film Deadpool 2, which was also included in the film's soundtrack release.
 The song was featured in the 2012 game Sleeping Dogs, as a track in the game's karaoke minigame.

References

1979 songs
1980 singles
1999 singles
Air Supply songs
Westlife songs
Delta Goodrem songs
Songs written by Clive Davis
Songs written by Graham Russell
Arista Records singles
Virgin Records singles
1980s ballads